Anadasmus vacans is a moth of the family Depressariidae. It is found in French Guiana.

The wingspan is 38–40 mm. The forewings are light greyish-ochreous, usually with irregularly scattered black specks. The plical and second discal stigmata are minute and blackish, sometimes with a curved subterminal series of minute blackish dots. There is a terminal series of minute blackish dots. The hindwings are dark grey, with the apex more or less tinged with pale ochreous.

References

Moths described in 1916
Anadasmus
Moths of South America